I'll See You in My Dreams is a 2015 American comedy-drama film directed, co-written, and co-produced by Brett Haley. It stars Blythe Danner, Martin Starr, Sam Elliott, Malin Åkerman, June Squibb, Rhea Perlman, and Mary Kay Place. It was released on May 15, 2015 in a limited release by Bleecker Street.

Plot
Widow and former singer Carol Petersen lives alone in California with her dog, Hazel. Life is very routine, as she has not had a relationship since her husband died 20 years ago and has no desire to date or marry again.

One day she must put the elderly dog down, so she hasn't got a companion outside of her friends Georgina, Rona, and Sally who live at a retirement community. Coming home from the vet, she finds a large rat in her house, leading her to sleep outside for the night, where she meets her new pool man, Lloyd. Although he initially offends her, they begin an unlikely friendship.

Carol meets Bill while shopping and he flirts with her before leaving. Later, her friends convince her to do seniors speed dating, and Carol is uninterested in the men she meets. Encountering Bill outside, he asks her out.

When Carol goes home, she calls Lloyd to go to karaoke. He is a mediocre singer, but she impresses him with her ability. They go back to her house, and they discuss "living in the moment," which Carol dismisses. Lloyd is not looking forward to anything in his life, and feels he has no real prospects other than caring for his mother.

Bill wants to see Carol at the retirement community where he lives. They go out on his boat, the "So What" - which he has never done with anyone else. He bought it on a whim, as he did not want to be a retiree who fell into boring, stagnant routines. After dinner, Bill drives her home, and they kiss. He wants to see her again, and Carol is giddy, until she sees the rat again.

Carol and her friends get high, steal a cart after shopping, and evade a curious policeman. Getting home, she has a message from Bill, wanting another date. He spends the night and they are very much taken with one another. Over breakfast, he asks her if she would marry again. Carol lightheartedly scoffs, saying she hardly knows him. The doorbell interrupts them. Lloyd tells her that he quit his job, though he did get one as a pool cleaner. Carol is reluctant to invite Lloyd in, but Bill invites Lloyd to breakfast. Awkwardly, Lloyd says he just wanted to tell her about the new job and leaves.

Bill wants to see Carol again, but her daughter Katherine has come to town. She notes that her mom seems different, in a good way. Carol tells her that she is seeing someone, and Katherine wants to meet him. However, frantic messages from Rona are on her answering machine when they get back home, as Bill is in the hospital.

As only immediate family can see him, Carol isn't admitted. Sadly, she soon gets a call that he has died, and grieves that she has lost someone again. She asks Katherine why people bother getting attached when death is inevitable, a sentiment she expressed to Lloyd earlier. Katherine points out all the good things that happened because Carol took chances and risks.

Carol's grief is palpable, but once her daughter has returned to New York, she again returns to the routines of playing golf and cards with her friends. She goes to see Bill's moored boat, and when one of her friends asks about it, Carol says it's still there. He had no one to leave it to, and she'd asked Bill's lawyer if she could have something of Bill's as a keepsake.

One day, as she is dusting the fireplace mantel - framed family photos, a large urn (her husband's ashes) and tin containing her dog's remains - she finds a cigar lying there, presumably the type Bill always had in his mouth, unlit, an old habit.

Lloyd comes to visit Carol in his new uniform. The rat appears again and he traps it, and afterwards Carol finally cries over losing Bill. He comforts her, playing a song that he wrote, "I'll See You in My Dreams." Later, Carol is with her friends, and Sally insists they all go on a cruise together. At first reluctant, Carol impulsively convinces the others. The film ends with Carol adopting an elderly dog and driving home with him, taking another chance at love.

Cast
 Blythe Danner as Carol Petersen
 Martin Starr as Lloyd
 Sam Elliott as Bill
 Malin Åkerman as Katherine Petersen
 June Squibb as Georgina
 Rhea Perlman as Sally
 Mary Kay Place as Rona

Marketing
The official theatrical trailer was released on April 7, 2015.

Release
I'll See You in My Dreams premiered at the 2015 Sundance Film Festival on January 27, 2015, where it was acquired by Bleecker Street. It received a limited release on May 15, 2015.

Critical reception
The film received largely positive reviews from critics. On Rotten Tomatoes, it has a rating of 93%, based on 91 reviews, with an average rating of 7.3/10. The site's critical consensus reads, "I'll See You in My Dreams would be worth watching even if Blythe Danner's central performance was all it had going for it, but this thoughtful drama satisfies on multiple levels." On Metacritic, the film has a score of 75 out of 100, based on 27 critics, indicating "generally favorable reviews".

Accolades

References

External links
 
 
 
 
 Official screenplay

2015 films
2015 comedy-drama films
American comedy-drama films
American independent films
Bleecker Street films
Films about music and musicians
Films about old age
Films about widowhood
Films directed by Brett Haley
Films scored by Keegan DeWitt
Films set in California
Films shot in California
Films shot in Los Angeles
2015 independent films
2010s English-language films
2010s American films